Woi or WOI may refer to: 

 WOI (AM), a radio station (640 AM) in Ames, Iowa
 WOI-FM, a radio station (90.1 FM) Ames, Iowa
 WOI-DT, a television station in Ames, Iowa
 Warrant Officer Class I, a rank in the British Armed Forces
 Woi language, a Malayo-Polynesian language
 Women's Organization of Iran, an Iranian women's rights organization